Labour Clauses (Public Contracts) Convention, 1949 is  an International Labour Organization (ILO) Convention adopted in Geneva on 29 June 1949. Its preamble states:
Having decided upon the adoption of certain proposals concerning labour clauses in public contracts ....
The convention requires subscribing states to ensure that public procurement contracts contain clauses ensuring that workers performing the contract would be entitled to "wages ..., hours of work and other conditions" which would be "not less favourable than those established for work of the same character in the trade or industry concerned in the district where the work is carried on".

Ratifications
As of February 2023, the convention had 62 state parties. Although the United Kingdom was the first country to ratify the convention, Norman Tebbitt, Secretary of State for Employment, arranged for the UK government to renounce it on 20 September 1982. Article 14 makes provision for states which have ratified the convention to denounce it on provision of due notice to the Director-General of the ILO.

References

External links 
Text.
Ratifications, accessed 23 June 2018.

International Labour Organization conventions
Treaties concluded in 1949
Treaties entered into force in 1952
Treaties of Algeria
Treaties of Antigua and Barbuda
Treaties of Armenia
Treaties of Austria
Treaties of the Bahamas
Treaties of Barbados
Treaties of Belgium
Treaties of Belize
Treaties of Bosnia and Herzegovina
Treaties of the military dictatorship in Brazil
Treaties of the People's Republic of Bulgaria
Treaties of Burundi
Treaties of Cameroon
Treaties of the Central African Republic
Treaties of Costa Rica
Treaties of Cuba
Treaties of Cyprus
Treaties of the Republic of the Congo (Léopoldville)
Treaties of Denmark
Treaties of Djibouti
Treaties of Dominica
Treaties of the United Arab Republic
Treaties of Finland
Treaties of the French Fourth Republic
Treaties of Ghana
Treaties of Grenada
Treaties of Guatemala
Treaties of Guinea
Treaties of Guyana
Treaties of Ba'athist Iraq
Treaties of Israel
Treaties of Italy
Treaties of Jamaica
Treaties of Kenya
Treaties of Malaysia
Treaties of Mauritania
Treaties of Mauritius
Treaties of Morocco
Treaties of the Netherlands
Treaties of Nigeria
Treaties of Norway
Treaties of Panama
Treaties of the Philippines
Treaties of Rwanda
Treaties of Saint Lucia
Treaties of Saint Vincent and the Grenadines
Treaties of Serbia
Treaties of Sierra Leone
Treaties of Singapore
Treaties of the Solomon Islands
Treaties of the Somali Republic
Treaties of Francoist Spain
Treaties of Suriname
Treaties of Eswatini
Treaties of Tanganyika
Treaties of North Macedonia
Treaties of Turkey
Treaties of Uganda
Treaties of Uruguay
Treaties of the Yemen Arab Republic
Treaties extended to Curaçao and Dependencies
Treaties extended to Greenland
Treaties extended to the Faroe Islands
Treaties extended to the Belgian Congo
Treaties extended to Ruanda-Urundi
Treaties extended to French Guiana
Treaties extended to Martinique
Treaties extended to Guadeloupe
Treaties extended to Réunion
Treaties extended to the Colony of Aden
Treaties extended to the Colony of the Bahamas
Treaties extended to the West Indies Federation
Treaties extended to British Honduras
Treaties extended to Bermuda
Treaties extended to the Colony of North Borneo
Treaties extended to the Bechuanaland Protectorate
Treaties extended to British Somaliland
Treaties extended to the British Virgin Islands
Treaties extended to Brunei (protectorate)
Treaties extended to British Cyprus
Treaties extended to the Colony of Fiji
Treaties extended to Gibraltar
Treaties extended to Guernsey
Treaties extended to British Guiana
Treaties extended to Jersey
Treaties extended to British Kenya
Treaties extended to the Crown Colony of Malta
Treaties extended to the Gilbert and Ellice Islands
Treaties extended to the Isle of Man
Treaties extended to British Mauritius
Treaties extended to the Colony and Protectorate of Nigeria
Treaties extended to the Colony of Sarawak
Treaties extended to the Colony of Sierra Leone
Treaties extended to the Crown Colony of Singapore
Treaties extended to the British Solomon Islands
Treaties extended to Swaziland (protectorate)
Treaties extended to Tanganyika (territory)
Treaties extended to the Uganda Protectorate
Treaties extended to the Sultanate of Zanzibar
Treaties extended to the Aden Protectorate
1949 in labor relations
1982 in labor relations